Divij Sharan (born 2 March 1986) is an Indian professional tennis player. He specialises in doubles and competes on the ATP World Tour. He has won 5 ATP World Tour titles in men's doubles and represents India in the Davis Cup. He won a gold medal in the men's doubles at the 2018 Asian Games.

Personal and early life
Sharan was born in New Delhi. He began playing tennis at the age of seven at a local tennis academy. His favorite surfaces are grass and hard courts. His overall favorite shot is the volley. His idols growing up were Roger Federer, Mahesh Bhupathi and Leander Paes. He married British tennis player Samantha Murray in July 2019.

Junior career
Sharan's best junior world doubles ranking was No. 5 in 2003. His best result in Grand Slam junior championships was his semifinal appearance at the 2004 French Open where he partnered with compatriot Tushar Liberhan.

Professional career

Early years
Sharan turned pro in 2004. He found limited success in singles and developed as doubles specialist. He won his first Futures doubles title 3 years later, in 2007. He reached his first doubles ATP Challenger finals in 2010 at the Kyoto Challenger in Japan. He won his first doubles ATP Challenger title in September 2011 at the Ningbo Challenger in China. He continued to find success in doubles at both ITF and Challenger events. By the end of 2011, he had won 16 ITF titles and 1 ATP Challenger title.

2012: Breakthrough
2012 proved to be a breakthrough year for Sharan on the ATP Challenger Tour. He reached 8 ATP Challenger doubles finals and won 2 titles in the year. Sharan won the Busan Challenger with Yuki Bhambri and the Bangkok Challenger with Vishnu Vardhan. In September, Sharan made his Davis Cup debut against New Zealand. With his good run he entered into list of top 100 ranked doubles players and later finished the year close to top 100 doubles ranking at 107.

2013: First ATP World Tour title, top 100 debut

Sharan continued to impress at Challenger events. He reached 5 finals and won a title at the Kyoto Challenger. This was his first title with his most successful partner Purav Raja. The pair played together throughout the year and they found their biggest success by winning their first ATP World Tour title at the 2013 Claro Open in Bogota, Colombia. They defeated the second-seeded French-Dutch combination of Édouard Roger-Vasselin and Igor Sijsling in the final.

Sharan entered the qualifying draw at the 2013 Wimbledon Championships with Raja, with the pair successfully qualifying for the main draw. They lost in the first round to Nicholas Monroe and Simon Stadler. This was the first match at a Grand Slam event for both Raja and Sharan. At the 2013 US Open, Sharan partnered with Lu Yen-hsun from Chinese Taipei. The pair reached the third round where they lost to Aisam-ul-Haq Qureshi and Jean-Julien Rojer.

As a result of this good run, Sharan finished the year inside the top 100 doubles rankings for the first time at 71.

2014: Asian Games medal
Sharan reached 4 Challenger finals and won 2 titles in the year 2014. He won the Kyoto Challenger with Purav Raja and the Shanghai Challenger with Yuki Bhambri. His best result at an ATP World Tour event was a semifinal appearance at the 2014 Claro Open where he had partnered with Canadian player Adil Shamasdin.

At the 2014 Asian Games, Sharan won a bronze medal for India with Yuki Bhambri.

2015: Out of top 100
The year 2015 was not so successful for Sharan. He played with many different partners and reached 4 Challenger finals, winning 2 of them. He won the Guzzini Challenger with British partner Ken Skupski and the Izmir Challenger with compatriot Saketh Myneni. He played only a singles match at ATP World Tour level and lost it. He finished the year ranked 134 as a doubles player.

2016: Second ATP title, back to top 100
Sharan made an excellent comeback in 2016. He partnered with Purav Raja and reached 6 ATP Challenger finals, winning 4 of them. They won the Manchester Trophy Challenger, Aegon Surbiton Trophy, Open Castilla y León and Pune Challenger. The pair also won their second ATP World Tour title at the Los Cabos Open in Mexico. They defeated the pair of Jonathan Erlich and Ken Skupski in the final. Sharan finished the year with doubles ranking of No. 63.

2017: Entry into the top 50
Sharan started the new season on strong note. He reached his third ATP World Tour final at the 2017 Chennai Open partnering with Purav Raja. In an all Indian final, they lost to the team of Rohan Bopanna and Jeevan Nedunchezhiyan. He then reached his fourth ATP World Tour final and won his third ATP title in Belgium at the European Open with his new partner Scott Lipsky. They defeated the pair of Santiago González and Julio Peralta in the final.

Sharan had good run on the Challenger Tour as well. He reached four finals winning two of it. He won titles in Bordeaux with Purav Raja and Bangaluru with Mikhail Elgin. On the back of good results, Sharan entered the top-50 on 27 November 2017 and has been holding a spot inside the top-50 since then.

2018: Asian Games gold medal, first Grand Slam quarter final
Sharan started year with Maharashtra Open where he paired with compatriot Yuki Bhambri. The pair reached to the semis but lost to French pair of Pierre-Hugues Herbert and Gilles Simon. At Australian Open, he reached third round thus making his best performance at the event.

He won his first Challenger title of the season at Canberra Challenger. He continued with few more Challenger tournaments till April but later moved his focus entirely on ATP world tour.

At Wimbledon Championships, Sharan reached his first Gland Slam quarter-finals. He partnered with Artem Sitak from New Zealand. They lost to eventual champions Mike Bryan and Jack Sock.

Sharan finished another year inside the top 50 with doubles ranking of 39.

2019: Fourth and fifth titles

Sharan began the year teaming up with his compatriot Rohan Bopanna. The new pairing started off with a bang by capturing the Pune open doubles title in front of the home crowd. This was Sharan's 4th title on ATP tour. Following this result the pair lost a few close matches and they mutually decided to end their partnership citing their low combined ranking as the primary reason behind the split. Divij then teamed up with the Brazilian doubles specialist Marcelo Demolinor and reached the doubles final in the Bavarian open. Following this he reached the round of 16 in Wimbledon. Divij won his 5th title in ATP tour teaming up with Igor Zelenay in St Petersburg, Russia to win his second title of the year.

ATP career finals

Doubles: 7 (5 titles, 2 runners-up)

Challenger and Futures finals

Singles: 3 (0–3)

Doubles: 72 (37–35)

Doubles performance timeline

Current through the 2021 US Open

References

External links
 
 
 

1986 births
Living people
Indian male tennis players
Racket sportspeople from Delhi
Tennis players at the 2014 Asian Games
Tennis players at the 2018 Asian Games
Asian Games medalists in tennis
Asian Games bronze medalists for India
Medalists at the 2014 Asian Games
Medalists at the 2018 Asian Games
Asian Games gold medalists for India
South Asian Games gold medalists for India
South Asian Games silver medalists for India
South Asian Games medalists in tennis
Recipients of the Arjuna Award